Volia is an extinct monospecific genus of mekosuchine crocodylians from Fiji named in 2002. Notwithstanding its comparatively small size, it was probably the apex predator of the Pleistocene ecosystems of Fiji. Fossils of Volia athollandersoni, the type and currently only known species, have been found in the Voli-Voli and Wainibuku Caves of Viti Levu Island. The holotype is housed in the collection of the Museum of New Zealand Te Papa Tongarewa. V. athollandersoni and the other large reptiles of Fiji may have been exterminated by human hunting soon after Fiji was colonized by ancient Polynesians.

Etyomology
V. athollandersoni is named after the New Zealand archaeologist Atholl Anderson.

Phylogeny
A 2018 tip dating study by Lee & Yates simultaneously using morphological, molecular (DNA sequencing), and stratigraphic (fossil age) data established the inter-relationships within Crocodylia. The cladogram below shows the placement of Volia within Mekosuchinae:

References

Mekosuchinae
Prehistoric pseudosuchian genera
Holocene extinctions
Pleistocene crocodylomorphs
Pleistocene first appearances
Prehistoric vertebrates of Oceania
Reptiles of Fiji
Fossil taxa described in 2002